Nu'uuli is a village on the central east coast of Tutuila Island, American Samoa. It is located on a peninsula several miles up from Pago Pago International Airport. Nu’uuli is located between Pago Pago International Airport and Coconut Point. It is a shopping district which is home to stores such as South Pacific Traders, Nu’uuli Shopping Center, Aiga Supermarket and many more shops.

It is the fifth-largest village in land area in American Samoa and the second-largest on Tutuila Island. It straddles the line between the Eastern District and the Western District. This makes it the only village in American Samoa that occupies two districts. It has a total land area of 7.87 km², with 6.23 km² being in the Eastern District and 1.64 km² being in the Western District. Its total population as of the 2010 census was 3,955, with the Eastern District portion containing 2,844 persons and the Western District portion 2,310 persons.

First Lady Lady Bird Johnson dedicated Manulele Tausala Elementary School in Nu'uuli on October 10, 1966. The school is named after the first lady.

Nu’uuli has one of the highest crime rates in American Samoa. The first neighborhood watch type program in the territory was established here by the Department of Public Safety in 2014.

Geography
The best surfing conditions in American Samoa can be found in Faganeanea and neighboring Nu’uuli, however, great surfing can also be found in the 'Āmanave-Poloa area.

Nu'uuli Pala
Nu'uuli Pala is Tutuila Island’s largest mangrove swamp. It borders nearly all of Pala Lagoon’s shoreline. The pala has been designated a special management area in recognition of its size and significance to wildlife and fish habitat. It is the largest and also the most threatened wetland in American Samoa; 33 percent of the mangrove swamp has been converted to dry land since 1961.

The wetland, excluding the open water of the lagoon, covers 123 acres of mangrove forest and swamp. The majority of the swamp is covered with red mangrove and oriental mangrove. Several areas of other freshwater marsh vegetation are interspersed with the mangroves. A small area of saltwater marsh borders the end of Coconut Point. The wetland is an important wildlife and fish habitat, and also provides recreational opportunities as canoeing and fishing. Nu'uuli Pala has been designated a Special Management Area under the American Samoa Coastal Management Act of 1990.

Rare species found here include Xylocarpus moluccensis (le’ile’i) and the uncommon shrub Sophora tomentosa, which is also reported on Aunu'u. Nu’uuli Pala is a common feeding site for the Reef Heron (matu’u), a bird species which usually feeds on the coral reefs.

Nu’uuli Falls
Nu’uuli Falls is a 65-feet secluded cascade with a swimming hole beneath. To get here, turn left at Nu’uuli Family Mart when coming from the west. Follow this road veering left at the pig farm. Enter the trailhead and follow the hiking trail for about 15 minutes. Veer left at the first trail juncture, and follow until the trail reaches the stream. Nu’uuli Falls is made up of seven individual waterfalls.

Economy
Nu’uuli is the commercial center of Tutuila Island. There is a large number of mini-marts, sewing shops, and clothing stores along Main Road. Nu’uuli is also home to several hardware and home-improvement shops, along with salons and souvenir stores.

Nu’uuli Twin Cinemas is the only movie theater in American Samoa and has two screens. It plays major blockbuster films, children’s movies, and more. Just past the theater is Laufou Shopping Center. An area in Nu’uuli is known as Coconut Point and is home to a combination of local villagers and contract workers.

Demographics
Nu’uuli village had the highest number of registered voters as of 2017 with a total of 1,717 registered voters, followed by the villages of Leone, Tafuna, and Pago Pago.

Notable people
 Freddie Letuli
 Lonnie Palelei, NFL football player
 Maa Tanuvasa, NFL football player
 Lemanu Peleti Sialega Mauga, politician
 Tony Solaita, first American Samoan MLB-player.
 Malaetasi Mauga Togafau, Attorney General of American Samoa (1993 - 1996 and        2005- 2007)

References
 Nu'uuli village and its parts; United States Census Bureau

Villages in American Samoa
Tutuila